The men's eight-ball singles tournament at the 2006 Asian Games in Doha, Qatar took place from 7 December to 9 December at Al-Sadd Multi-Purpose Hall.

Schedule
All times are Arabia Standard Time (UTC+03:00)

Results

Finals

Top half

Section 1

Section 2

Bottom half

Section 3

Section 4

References 
Results
Draw

External links 
 Official Website

Cue sports at the 2006 Asian Games